Hans Georg Jacob Stang may refer to:

 Hans Georg Jacob Stang (prime minister) (1830–1907), Norwegian Prime Minister 1888 to 1889
 Hans Georg Jacob Stang (minister of defence) (1858–1907), Norwegian Minister of Defence 1900 to 1903